Harry Harris (September 8, 1922 – March 19, 2009) was an American television and film director.

Harris moved to Los Angeles in 1937 and got a mailroom job at Columbia Studios. After attending UCLA, he became an apprentice sound cutter, assistant sound effects editor, and then an assistant film editor at Columbia Pictures.  He enlisted in the Army Air Forces at the start of World War II, and as part of the First Motion Picture Unit, reported to Hal Roach Studios in Culver City.  His supervisor there was Ronald Reagan, who hired him as sound effects editor for training and combat films.

At the end of World War II, Harris became an assistant film editor and then an editor for Desilu, the studio of Desi Arnaz and Lucille Ball.  Over the next five decades, he directed hundreds of TV episodes, with significant contributions to Gunsmoke, Eight is Enough, The Waltons, and Falcon Crest. He won an Emmy Award for directing a 1982 episode of Fame, and was nominated for two other Emmy Awards and a Directors Guild of America Award.

References

External links

1922 births
2009 deaths
American film directors
American television directors
First Motion Picture Unit personnel
University of California, Los Angeles alumni